Dora Gad (Hebrew דורה גד; b. 1912, d. 31 December 2003) was an Israeli interior designer, whose work had significant influence on the development of modern Israeli architecture.

Biography
Dora Siegel (later Gad) was born in Câmpulung, Romania. She grew up in the home of her grandfather, and attended Hebrew school and a government-run school. Between 1930 and 1934, she studied at the Technische Universität in Vienna, and received her diploma in engineering and architecture. There she met her future husband, Heinrich Yehezkel Goldberg, an architecture student. They married in 1936, immigrated to Mandatory Palestine and settled in Tel Aviv. In 1959 she married Ephraim Ben-Artzi, a former general and public figure.

Interior design career
Gad began her career in the office of architect Oskar Kaufmann. In 1938 she began to work independently. In 1942 she began to design private apartments together with her husband. Her style was light and modern, drawing from local inspiration; abundant light, and local building materials. Gad incorporated locally available fabrics, wool carpets, woven work, straw and felt in her designs. Her style set her apart from many European educated architects of the day, who maintained more European styles of architecture.

By the 1950s, the couple were already prominent interior designers in Israel. They were involved in the planning of many government buildings and institutions.

After the death of Yehezkel Gad in 1958, Gad established a partnership with Arieh Noy, an employee in her office. The Gad-Noy firm continued to work on governmental projects, and they were responsible, in 1965, for the design of the Israel Museum, together with architect Al Mansfeld, and in 1966, for the interior design of the Knesset building.

The Gad-Noy firm operated until 1976. Gad continued to work independently in both the public and private sectors until her death, in 2003.

Notable projects
 The residence of the Prime Minister (Jerusalem, 1950)
 The residence of the Minister of Foreign Affairs (Jerusalem, 1950)
 The Sharon and Accadia luxury hotels (Herzliyyah, 1955)
 The Israeli National Library (Jerusalem, 1956)
 Israeli Embassies in Washington D.C. and Ankara
 The New York offices of EL AL, the national airline (New York, 1956 and London, 1959)
 The vessels of Zim, the national shipping line (together with the Mansfeld-Weinraub firm, 1955–1975)
 The interior design of the Israeli Parliament building, the Knesset (Jerusalem, 1958-1966), as part of a team of architects (Joseph Klarwein, Shimon Powsner, Dov Karmi, Ram Karmi, Bill Gillitt)
 The Tel Aviv Hilton Hotels (1965) and the Jerusalem Hilton (1974)
 The El Al terminal at Kennedy airport in New York (1970 and 1974)
 The Ben Gurion International Airport (1973)
 The Bank of Israel (Jerusalem, 1980)
 The Presidential residence in Talbiya, Jerusalem (1984–1985)

Awards and recognition
 In 1966, Gad won the Israel Prize, in architecture.
 Also in 1966, she received Domus magazine's Regulo D’Oro design prize for her plan of modular concrete units.

See also
List of Israel Prize recipients
 German and Austrian Women Architects in Mandatory Palestine (English and German), Sigal Davidi

References

1912 births
2003 deaths
Romanian Jews
Jews in Mandatory Palestine
Israeli Jews
Romanian emigrants to Mandatory Palestine
Israeli people of Romanian-Jewish descent
Israel Prize women recipients
Israel Prize in architecture recipients
Interior designers
Israeli women architects
People from Câmpulung